Julio Jesús de las Casas (born 12 April 1945) is a Venezuelan sports shooter. He competed at the 1980 Summer Olympics and the 1984 Summer Olympics.

References

External links
 

1945 births
Living people
Venezuelan male sport shooters
Olympic shooters of Venezuela
Shooters at the 1980 Summer Olympics
Shooters at the 1984 Summer Olympics
Place of birth missing (living people)
20th-century Venezuelan people
21st-century Venezuelan people